Epitettix' is a genus of ground-hoppers (Orthoptera: Caelifera) in the subfamily Cladonotinae and not assigned to any tribe; records are from Madagascar and Asia.

Species 
Epitettix includes the species:
 Epitettix convexa (Deng, 2021)
 Epitettix dammermanni Günther, 1939
 Epitettix emarginatus (Haan, 1843)
 Epitettix fatigans Günther, 1938
 Epitettix guangxiensis (Zheng & Jiang, 1994)
 Epitettix guibeiensis (Zheng & Jiang, 1995)
 Epitettix hainanensis (Deng, 2020)
 Epitettix humilicolus Günther, 1938
 Epitettix lativertex Günther, 1938
 Epitettix linaoshanensis (Liang & Jiang, 2004)
 Epitettix mikhailovi Storozhenko, 2021
 Epitettix nigritibis (Zheng & Jiang, 2000)
 Epitettix obtusus Storozhenko & Dawwrueng, 2014
 Epitettix parallelus (Podgornaya, 1986)
 Epitettix pimkarnae (Storozhenko & Dawwrueng, 2014)
 Epitettix punctatus Hancock, 1907 - type species
 Epitettix spheniscus Günther, 1974
 Epitettix strictivertex (Deng, 2020)
 Epitettix striganovae Storozhenko, 2012
 Epitettix torulosinota Zheng & Lin, 2016
 Epitettix tumidus Günther, 1938
 Epitettix yunnanensis (Zheng, 1995)

References

External links 
 

Tetrigidae
Caelifera genera
Orthoptera of Indo-China